Daniel P. Troy (born June 6, 1948, in Cleveland, Ohio) is an Ohio politician from Lake County, Ohio. In 2020, he was elected to the Ohio House of Representatives, having previously served seven terms in the House, interspersed with several terms as Commissioner for Lake County, Ohio. He represents the 23rd district, encompassing the cities of Eastlake, Mentor-on-the-Lake, Richmond Heights, Wickliffe, Willoughby, Willowick, half of Mentor, the villages of Gates Mills, Mayfield, and Timberlake.

Troy won re-election in the 2022 Statehouse race against George Phillips with 51.4% of the vote. In 2020, Dan Troy beat George Phillips with 50.7% of the vote. Although the area he represents is mostly the same from 2020, the district number changed from 60 to 23.

Daniel Troy is in his ninth term in the Ohio House of Representatives and serves as the Ranking Member on Ways and Means Committee. His other committee assignments include the Finance Committee, Ranking Member on Finance Subcommittee on Agriculture, State and Local Government, Public Utilities, and Armed Services.

Early life and education 
Troy was born in Cleveland and grew up in Lake County, Ohio. He graduated from St. Joseph High School and the University of Dayton with a Bachelor of Arts in political science. While a student, Troy was the Political Affairs Editor and then later News Editor of the University of Dayton Flyers News student newspaper.

References

1948 births
Living people
County officials in Ohio
Politicians from Cleveland
Democratic Party members of the Ohio House of Representatives
People from Lake County, Ohio
21st-century American politicians